Eefje is a feminine Dutch given name. Notable people with the name include:

Eefje Depoortere (born 1987), also known as Sjokz, Belgian television presenter, reporter, eSports player, and beauty pageant contestant
Eefje Muskens (born 1989), Dutch badminton player
Eefje de Visser (born 1986), Dutch singer-songwriter

Dutch feminine given names